Widow's Walk (2002) is a detective novel by American crime writer Robert B. Parker, the 29th in his Spenser series.

Plot summary
Boston bank manager Nathan Smith has been shot through the head while lying in bed. His new wife Mary, is the chief suspect, although she swears she was watching television at the time and never even heard the gunshot. Despite mounting evidence against her, and a prosecution witness who claims Mary hired him to kill her husband, the defence make a last-ditch attempt at proving her innocence by hiring Spenser, the Boston-based P.I. However, everyone Spenser speaks with is systematically murdered.

2002 American novels
Spenser (novel series)
American detective novels